Torcegno (Torzén or Traozén in local dialect) is a comune (municipality) in Trentino in the northern Italian region Trentino-Alto Adige/Südtirol, located about  east of Trento.

Torcegno borders the following municipalities: Palù del Fersina, Telve di Sopra, Fierozzo, Ronchi Valsugana, Roncegno Terme, Telve di Sopra and Borgo Valsugana.

References

Cities and towns in Trentino-Alto Adige/Südtirol